Carlyle Smith Beals,  FRS (June 29, 1899 – July 2, 1979) was a Canadian astronomer.

Early life and education 
Carl Beals was born in Canso, Nova Scotia to Reverend Francis H. P. Beals and Annie Florence Nightingale Smith, on June 29, 1899. He is the brother of artist and educator Helen D. Beals.

Beals received a Bachelor of Arts degree from Acadia University in 1919, specializing in physics and mathematics. Although he wished to continue his studies, he was forced to postpone those plans due to poor health. He taught at a small country school in Nova Scotia during the winter of 1920.

He began his Ph.D. studies in physics at Yale University in 1921, but was forced to return home in the winter of 1921 when his health failed again. He resumed his graduate studies in 1922 at University of Toronto and received a master's degree in Physics in 1923. His master's thesis work on triboluminescence spectra, the frequencies of light generated by breaking chemical bonds, was done under the supervision of John Cunningham McLennan, one of the leading physicists in Canada at the time.

Beals spent one year as the Science Master at the High School of Quebec in Quebec City, before enrolling in a graduate programme in physics in 1924 at the Royal College of Science at Imperial College London. Working under Alfred Fowler, he studied the Zeeman effect and the spectra of palladium, copper, and ionized silver. During this time Beals became acquainted with observational astronomy by using the small observatory in the Royal College of Science building. He received a Ph.D. in 1926.

Career 
After obtaining his PhD, Beals returned to Acadia University as an assistant professor of physics, but left one year later for an Assistant Astronomer position at the Dominion Astrophysical Observatory (DAO), Victoria, British Columbia. Beals worked at the Dominion Astrophysical Observatory from 1927 until 1946, becoming Assistant Director of the DAO in 1940.

At the DAO, he studied emission lines in the spectra of hot stars and gas clouds in the interstellar medium. His work established a reliable temperature scale for hotter stars, based on their spectra. He showed that the broad emission lines seen in Wolf-Rayet and P Cygni-type stars were due to strong stellar winds. Beals was the first astronomer to quantitatively measure the ratio of sodium and calcium absorption lines in the interstellar medium (the gas between stars) and the ratio of the two lines in the sodium D doublet. He also found that rather than being uniform, the interstellar medium was clumpy and moved with different velocities.

During his time at the DAO, he developed several astronomical instruments to analyse astronomical spectra, including a self-recording micro-photometer and a high efficiency grating spectrograph.

During World War II, Beals spent two-year researching defenses against chemical weapons and designed gas masks.

In 1946, he left the Dominion Astrophysical Observatory in British Columbia and began work at the Dominion Observatory in Ottawa, Ontario. He was appointed Dominion Astronomer one year later, and began to rebuild the observatory's scientific programme, which had suffered due to budget cuts during the great depression and a lack of staff during World War II. He also oversaw the establishment of the Dominion Radio Astrophysical Observatory, near Penticton, British Columbia.

While in Ottawa, he became interested in the geophysical activities of the observatory. He began a study of meteorite impact craters in the Canadian shield, searching for circular features in aerial photographs and organising drill core studies of the most promising targets.

He retired in 1964, but continued his work on impact craters and published several works during his retirement.

Awards and recognition 
Beals was elected a fellow of the Royal Society of Canada in 1933. He was president of Academy of Science of the Royal Society of Canada from 1949-1950 and received the Henry Marshall Tory Medal from the Society in 1957 for outstanding achievement in scientific research.

He served as president of the Royal Astronomical Society of Canada from 1951-1952. He also served as president of the American Astronomical Society from 1962-1964, the only Canadian to hold the position.

In March, 1951 Beals was elected a Fellow of the Royal Society of London. In 1966 he was awarded the inaugural Meteoritical Society Leonard Medal for his work on identifying Canadian impact craters. In 1969 he was made an Officer of the Order of Canada.

He received honorary degrees from  Acadia University, the University of New Brunswick, Queen's University and the University of Pittsburgh.

The asteroid 3314 Beals and the crater Beals on the Moon are both named after him.

Personal life 
In 1931, Carl Beals married Miriam White Bancroft, a professional musician and piano teacher. She was the daughter of Joseph Bancroft, a longtime Liberal member of the Nova Scotia House of Assembly. The couple adopted a daughter, Janitza.

Beals died on July 2, 1979, aged 80.

Selected publications

Archives
There is a Carlyle Beals fonds at Library and Archives Canada. Archival reference number is R15735.

References

Further reading
 Carlyle Smith Beals

1899 births
1979 deaths
20th-century Canadian astronomers
Canadian people of English descent
Officers of the Order of Canada
People from Guysborough County, Nova Scotia
Fellows of the Royal Society
Presidents of the Royal Astronomical Society of Canada